Pastal Kuh (also Romanized as Pasţāl Kūh; also known as Pastaleh Kūh) is a village in Khorgam Rural District, Khorgam District, Rudbar County, Gilan Province, Iran. At the 2006 census, its population was 117, in 30 families.

References 

Populated places in Rudbar County